The Matk Cirque, in older sources also the Jezera Valley (dolina Jezera) is an Alpine glacial valley in Slovenia.

Geography
The Matk Cirque lies in the upper catchment area of the Savinja River in the Kamnik–Savinja Alps of Slovenia. It is surrounded by high mountains to the southwest, from Cold Mountain to the west to Mount Savinjka to the east. The border between Slovenia and Austria runs along the western ridge, and to the east it borders the Logar Valley. The Matk Cirque is relatively remote and difficult to reach. There is a forest road into it from the Logar Valley, which also connects the farms in it. At the bottom of the valley, this road branches off from the road leading to the former border crossing at the Pavlič Pass in the Karawanks.

Below Cold Mountain in the southwest part of the valley there are well-formed cirques. The eastern ridge above the valley consists of solid dolomite. The southern part of the valley consists of Triassic limestone, and it is only in the north that late Paleozoic impermeable rock is exposed, which is already part of the Karawanks.

The valley floor spreads out only in the upper part of the cirque. The valley floor is filled by gravel carried by flashy streams and glacial moraines. Jezera Creek has its source in the middle of the valley; below its spring it has carved out and narrowed the valley, creating the picturesque Lamotje Gorge in the limestone rock where it enters the Logar Valley. During the Pleistocene the valley was filled by a glacier that extended to the Logar Valley and joined the glacier there.

Natural monuments
A hiking trail leads to Škaf. The Matk Window, a natural window created by erosion, is also visible from the valley floor.

Settlement
The Matk Cirque has four isolated farms in clearings surrounded by spruce forest.

References

Sources
 Inventar najpomembnejše naravne dediščine Slovenije (Matkov kot), Ljubljana, 1991

External links
 The Matk Cirque at Geopedia
 Gore-ljudje.net Matkov kot

Valleys in Styria (Slovenia)
Valleys in the Kamnik–Savinja Alps
Savinja basin